Edward Finlay McLean (12 October 1893 – 29 May 1915) was an Australian rules footballer who played with Geelong in the Victorian Football League (VFL). He was killed in action in World War I.

Football career
He played two league games for Geelong, both in the 1912 VFL season, the first in round 15 against Collingwood at Victoria Park. Matched up against Collingwood wingman Percy Gibb, his performance on debut was described as promising by the Geelong Advertiser. His only other VFL appearance for Geelong came in round 18, a 37-point win by Geelong over Richmond at Corio Oval.

Military service
On 18 August 1914, McLean enlisted in the army and two months later embarked from Melbourne on the HMAT Benalla (A24), to serve with the 8th Battalion. He took part in the Gallipoli Campaign and was killed in action on 29 May 1915, aged 21.

Personal life
McLean, the youngest son of Norman and Jane McLean, was born in Geelong on 12 October 1893. He had two brothers, Archie and Norman.

References

External links

1893 births
Geelong Football Club players
Australian military personnel killed in World War I
Australian rules footballers from Geelong
1915 deaths